The hooded whistler (Pachycephala implicata) or Guadalcanal hooded whistler is a species of bird in the family Pachycephalidae. It is found on Guadalcanal in the Solomon Islands. Its natural habitat is subtropical or tropical moist montane forest. Prior to 2014, the Bougainville whistler was considered conspecific with the Hooded whistler.

References

hooded whistler
Birds of Guadalcanal
hooded whistler
Taxonomy articles created by Polbot